Torrita may refer to:

 Torrita, Victoria, locality situated on the section of the Mallee Highway and Pinnaroo railway line between Ouyen and the South Australian border in the Sunraysia region
 Torrita di Siena, municipality in the Province of Siena in the Italian region Tuscany
 Torrita Tiberina, municipality in the Metropolitan City of Rome in the Italian region Lazio